Vollenborn is a village and a former municipality in the district of Eichsfeld in Thuringia, Germany. Since 31 December 2013, it is part of the municipality Deuna.

References

Former municipalities in Thuringia